Vincenzo Alfonso Visco (born 18 March 1942, in Foggia) is an Italian politician and economist who has served as a government minister.

He gained an MSc in Economics at the University of York in 1969 and was awarded an honorary degree in 2004.

Visco was elected to the Parliament of Italy in 1983 for the Sinistra Indipendente group, joining the Democratic Party of the Left in 1991, the Democrats of the Left in 1998 and the Democratic Party in 2007. He served as Italian Minister of Finance for a few days in 1993 and then again from 1996 to 2000 and Treasury Minister from 2000 to 2001.

He returned to government in 2006 as Vice-Minister of Economy, a role in which he courted controversy. He was accused of using his political influence to benefit Unipol in a bank takeover, although he was cleared of any illegal activity. He also hit the headlines in this role when he described the country's debt as "a disaster". One of his final acts in this role was to publish the tax details of every Italian citizen for 2005 in a move he described as 'an act of transparency, of democracy, similar to what happens elsewhere in the world'.

References

1942 births
Living people
Finance ministers of Italy
Italian economists
People from Foggia
Alumni of the University of York
Academic staff of the Sapienza University of Rome
Democrats of the Left politicians
Democratic Party of the Left politicians
20th-century Italian politicians